Crazies Hill is a hamlet in the English county of Berkshire. It adjoins the hamlet of Cockpole Green. For local government purposes, the village is within the civil parish of Wargrave, which in turn is within the unitary authority of Wokingham.  Crazies Hill Church of England Primary School is located in the village. About  on the road to Wargrave is Hennerton Golf Club. The Village Hall was originally built to serve also as a Mission church and still contains the paraphernalia of an altar etc. behind folding doors.

It was moved to Crazies Hill by Major WHM Willis during 1898 when the new Town Hall was built. He had the facade including the cupola and entrance hall re-erected here as the basis for his new country house originally called Crazies. By the side of a woodland track to the south of the hamlet is Rebecca's Well. This is the site of the spring which used to be the hamlet's water supply. In 1870, the curate of Wargrave, the Rev Grenville Phillimore, invited subscriptions to fund a proper basin for the spring to keep the water clean. Later further money was raised to build a brick structure around the spring to keep out fallen leaves and other debris.

References

External links

Hamlets in Berkshire
Borough of Wokingham